Jambai is a panchayat town in Erode district in the Indian state of Tamil Nadu.

Demographics
 India census, Jambai had a population of 14,999. Males constitute 51% of the population and females 49%. Jambai has an average literacy rate of 54%, lower than the national average of 59.5%: male literacy is 63%, and female literacy is 45%. In Jambai, 9% of the population is under 6 years of age.
Pincode is 638312.

Villages
 
 
Periyavadamalaipalayam

References

Cities and towns in Erode district